This is a list of public holidays in Saint Pierre and Miquelon. Official public holidays in Saint Pierre and Miquelon are the same as those in France and are regulated by Article L222-1 du Code du travail (Labour Code).

References

Lists of public holidays by country
Saint Pierre and Miquelon
Saint Pierre and Miquelon